Karl-Heinrich Schulz (6 May 1906 – 28 July 1986) was a highly decorated Generalmajor in the Luftwaffe during World War II. He was also a recipient of the Knight's Cross of the Iron Cross. Karl-Heinrich Schulz was captured by Allied troops in May 1945 and was held until December 1947.

Awards and decorations
 Iron Cross (1939)
 2nd Class
 1st Class
 German Cross in Gold (27 July 1942)
 Knight's Cross of the Iron Cross on 9 June 1944 as Generalmajor and Chef des Generalstabes (Chief of Staff) of Luftflotte 4

References

Citations

Bibliography

External links
TracesOfWar.com

1906 births
1986 deaths
People from Wilhelmshaven
People from the Province of Hanover
Luftwaffe World War II generals
Recipients of the Gold German Cross
Recipients of the Knight's Cross of the Iron Cross
German prisoners of war in World War II
Reichsmarine personnel
Major generals of the Luftwaffe
Military personnel from Lower Saxony